"Watermelon Crawl" is a song written by Buddy Brock and Zack Turner, and recorded by American country music artist Tracy Byrd.  It was released in July 1994, as the second single from his album No Ordinary Man.  The song peaked at number 4 on the country charts in the United States and number 8 in Canada. It also peaked at number 81 on the U.S. Billboard Hot 100.

Content
The song chronicles the adventure of the narrator in the fictional location of Rhine County, Georgia where a  watermelon festival is taking place. The featured item at this festival is red wine made from the watermelons grown in the area. The mayor urges people to abide by the law and asks them not to drive if they have been drinking; instead, they should do a dance called "The Watermelon Crawl."

Music video
The music video was directed by Michael Merriman and features Byrd and his mates getting off of his tour bus in the Georgia town for the watermelon festival. Scenes also feature Byrd singing the song and dancing with people. The video was shot in McEwen, Tennessee, at the Irish Picnic Fairgrounds and not in Georgia.

Chart positions

Year-end charts

References

1994 singles
1994 songs
Tracy Byrd songs
MCA Records singles
Songs about Georgia (U.S. state)
Songs written by Buddy Brock
Songs written by Zack Turner
Song recordings produced by Jerry Crutchfield
Watermelons
Songs about dancing